Sappho Darling is a 1968 film written by Albert Zugsmith.

Cast
Carol Young as Sappho
Yvonne d'Angers as Brigitte
Alyn Darnay as Sven
Sally Sanford as Luana
Julia Blackburn as Britt

References

External links

1968 films
1968 romantic drama films
1960s English-language films